Sarah Robinson may refer to:
 Sarah Scott (née Sarah Robinson, 1723–1795), writer and social reformer
 Sarah Robinson (activist) (1834–1921), temperance movement activist in the British Army
 Sarah Jane Robinson, Irish-born American serial killer
 Sarah Robinson (soccer), soccer player active in 2012 in American soccer
 Sarah Robinson (figure skater), former partner of Craig Buntin

Fictional
 Sarah Robinson, a character in 55 Days at Peking
 Sarah Robinson, a character in When the Boat Comes In
 Sarah Robinson, a character in Stranded

Other uses
 Ifield Community College or Sarah Robinson School

See also
Sara Tappan Doolittle Robinson, American writer and historian

Robinson, Sarah